"A Matter of Time" is the third and final single from Bec Cartwright's eponymous debut album. The song peaked at #26 on the Australian Singles Chart.

Track listing
"A Matter of Time" (radio mix) - 3:30
"A Matter of Time" (Quazimodo Rolex 12-inch remix) - 5:14
"A Matter of Time" (karaoke mix) - 3:22
"All Seats Taken" (music video)
"On the Borderline" (music video)

Charts

References

2003 singles
2003 songs
Bec Hewitt songs
Songs written by Matthew Gerrard